Jan Krzystyniak (born 14 March 1958 in Zielona Góra, Poland) is a retired Polish motorcycle speedway rider, and a speedway team manager. He was Polish Speedway Champion nine times, including pair and team championships.

Sport career
Jan Krzystyniak received his speedway license in 1978, following the steps of his brother Alfred. Until 1985 he rode for ZKŻ Zielona Góra, then he moved on to Unia Leszno (1986–1988), Stal Rzeszów (1989–1993, Polonia Piła (1994–1997) and Iskra Ostrów Wielkopolski (1998). Krzystyniak won 10 medals at Team Speedway Polish Championship: five golden (1981, 1982, 1985, 1987, 1988), one silver (1984) and four bronze medals (1979, 1986, 1996, 1997). During his career he was victorious at Polish Pairs Speedway Championship four times, he also came second in the Polish Individual Speedway Championship twice (1988, 1989).

Krzystyniak was very successful at many Polish individual tournaments:
 Golden Helmet - 1st place (1983), 2nd (1988), 3rd (1993),
 Bronislaw Idzikowski and Marek Czerny Memorial - 1st place (1983), 2nd (1989),
 Łańcuch Herbowy of the city of Ostrow Wielkopolski – 1st place (1985), 2nd (1984),
 Alfred Smoczyk Memorial - 1st place (1988, 1989)
 Eugeniusz Nazimek Memorial - 1st place (1987, 1990, 1992, 1993), 2nd place (1988, 1991),
 Mieczysław Połukard Criterium of Polish Speedway Leagues Aces - 2nd place (1991,1992).

Following his retirement as a speedway rider, he was appointed team manager of Unia Leszno, Włókniarz Częstochowa i Start Gniezno

References

Sources
 Jan Krzystyniak | Polish Speedway Database [Retrieved 2013-01-21]

Polish speedway riders
Living people
1958 births
People from Zielona Góra
Sportspeople from Lubusz Voivodeship